Gogo Dam  is a gravity dam located in Kagawa Prefecture in Japan. The dam is used for flood control. The catchment area of the dam is 12.4 km2. The dam impounds about 16  ha of land when full and can store 2500 thousand cubic meters of water. The construction of the dam was started on 1960 and completed in 1964.

See also
List of dams in Japan

References

Dams in Kagawa Prefecture